Calosoma pentheri is a species of ground beetle in the subfamily of Carabinae. It was described by Apfelbeck in 1918.

References

pentheri
Beetles described in 1918